Plovput can refer to:

 Plovput (Croatia), Croatian state-owned company in charge of maintenance and operations of maritime waterways and lighthouses
 Plovput (Serbia), Serbian government agency in charge of development and maintenance of river waterways